Akron/Family is the debut album by Akron/Family, released in 2005. The album was released on Young God Records on March 22 and was produced by the band with Michael Gira, head of the aforementioned record label.

The album is unusual for avoiding the band's more freeform elements. Seth from the group stated in an interview "I think when we made our first record, we had all these different sides to us as a band but we weren’t going to release a double record. I think Michael encouraged us to focus on some of things we’d recorded at home, stuff which tended to be more quiet"

The track listing for the double vinyl version is slightly different from the CD version, with each format having 2 unique tracks.

Track listing 

CD version

 "Before and Again" – 4:36
 "Suchness" – 3:26
 "Part of Corey" – 2:27
 "Italy" – 8:08
 "I'll Be on the Water" – 3:25
 "Running, Returning" – 4:33
 "Afford" – 3:57
 "Interlude: Ak Ak Was the Boat They Sailed in On" – 2:31
 "Sorrow Boy" – 3:43
 "Shoes" – 3:42
 "Lumen" – 5:30 – (CD exclusive)
 "How Do I Know" – 2:30
 "Franny/You're Human" – 5:58
 "[Untitled]" – 6:24 – (CD exclusive)

Vinyl version

side a
 "Before and Again" – 4:33
 "Suchness" – 3:26
 "Part of Corey" – 2:23
 "Dylan Pt.1" – 4:20 – (vinyl exclusive)

side b
 "Italy" – 8:08
 "I'll Be on the Water" – 3:25
 "Running, Returning" – 4:33

side c
 "Afford" – 3:57
 "Interlude: Ak Ak Was the Boat They Sailed in On" – 2:31
 "Sorrow Boy" – 3:43
 "Shoes" – 3:42

side d
 "Positive Vibration Force" – 4:57 – (vinyl exclusive)
 "How Do I Know" – 2:26
 "Franny/You're Human" – 5:58

References 

2005 albums
Akron/Family albums
Young God Records albums
Albums produced by Michael Gira